At the 1936 Summer Olympics in Berlin, 29 athletics events were contested, 23 for men and 6 for women. The program of events was unchanged from the previous Games.  There was a total of 776 participants from 43 countries competing.

Medal summary

Men

Women

Records broken 
20 new Olympic records and 6 new world records were set in the athletics events.

Men's Olympic and world records

Women's Olympic and world records

References
1936 Summer Olympics results: athletics, from https://www.sports-reference.com/; retrieved 2010-04-05.
International Olympic Committee results database

Notes

 
1936 Summer Olympics events
1936
International athletics competitions hosted by Germany
1936 Olympics